Nenad Lukić (born 2 September 1992) is a Serbian professional footballer who plays as a forward for Hungarian club Budapest Honvéd.

Club career
Born in Sremska Mitrovica, Lukić came through the youth system of Partizan, together with Darko Brašanac and Miloš Jojić, among others. He made his senior debut with their affiliated side Teleoptik in 2010. In the 2011 winter transfer window, Lukić moved to Bulgarian club Lokomotiv Plovdiv. He returned to his homeland and signed with Rad in the summer of 2012. After failing to make an appearance with the Belgrade side, Lukić switched to Donji Srem in the 2013 winter transfer window.

In the summer of 2014, Lukić signed with Spartak Subotica. He subsequently joined Bežanija in the summer of 2015. After becoming the Serbian First League top scorer in 2015–16, Lukić secured a move to Serbian SuperLiga side Radnik Surdulica. He was later loaned to Zemun during the same transfer window, before signing with the club on a permanent basis in February 2017.

In the summer of 2017, Lukić returned to Rad, but would move to Borac Čačak in the 2018 winter transfer window. He subsequently joined Inđija in the summer of 2018.

In the 2019 winter transfer window, Lukić was acquired by ambitious TSC Bačka Topola. He scored nine goals in 15 games until the end of the season, helping the club win the Serbian First League and gain promotion to the Serbian SuperLiga for the first time in history. In the club's debut appearance in the top flight, Lukić became the league's joint top scorer with 16 goals, helping his team to a fourth-place finish to secure a spot in the UEFA Europa League next season.

In July 2021, Lukić moved abroad for the second time and signed with Hungarian club Budapest Honvéd.

International career
At international level, Lukić represented Serbia at the 2011 UEFA European Under-19 Championship, as the team was eliminated in the semi-finals. He was previously the team's top scorer during the qualification campaign for the final tournament with six goals in five games.

In January 2021, Lukić was capped twice for Serbia at full level, appearing in two friendlies.

Career statistics

Club

International

Honours

Club
TSC Bačka Topola
 Serbian First League: 2018–19

Individual
 Serbian SuperLiga Top Scorer: 2019–20

References

External links
 

1992 births
Living people
Sportspeople from Sremska Mitrovica
Serbian footballers
Association football forwards
Serbia youth international footballers
Serbia international footballers
FK Teleoptik players
PFC Lokomotiv Plovdiv players
FK Rad players
FK Donji Srem players
FK Spartak Subotica players
FK Bežanija players
FK Radnik Surdulica players
FK Zemun players
FK Borac Čačak players
FK Inđija players
FK TSC Bačka Topola players
Budapest Honvéd FC players
Serbian First League players
Serbian SuperLiga players
Nemzeti Bajnokság I players
Serbian expatriate footballers
Expatriate footballers in Bulgaria
Expatriate footballers in Hungary
Serbian expatriate sportspeople in Bulgaria
Serbian expatriate sportspeople in Hungary